The Meridionali Ro.37 Lince (Italian: "Lynx") was a two-seater Italian reconnaissance biplane, a product of the Industrie Meccaniche Aeronautiche Meridionali (IMAM) company. It appeared in 1934 and had a composite structure of wood and metal. The aeroplane first saw operational duty in the Second Italo-Ethiopian War (1935–1936) and Spanish Civil War (1936–1939), and during the Second World War it saw duty on almost all fronts, except for Russia and the English Channel. It followed the Ro.1 as the main reconnaissance aircraft for the Italian Army.

Design and development
A contest was held by the Regia Aeronautica for a light reconnaissance aircraft and a heavier aeroplane. The first was to have had 350 km/h (190 knots/220 mph) maximum speed, five hours endurance, three machine guns and a bomblets dispenser, armour, and the capability to operate from improvised airfields.

Limited production of the IMAM Ro.30, an improved Ro.1 with a defensive turret and better engine, resulted.

IMAM did not give up after the modest success of the Ro.30 and so designed a new aircraft, the Ro.37, which first flew in 1933.

This was a biplane of mixed construction, with two seats, and a  Fiat A.30 R.A. V-12 engine. It reached  and perhaps even more with this engine, the same as that of the Fiat CR.32. The Ro.37 had a  ceiling,  climb in 11 minutes, over  range, carrying three machine guns (two in the nose and one dorsal), twelve  bombs, and good agility. It was similar to the Hawker Hind, rather than a light army aircraft, and its performance was similar to the later Westland Lysander and the contemporary Hawker Hector.

The Ro.37 was later fitted with the  Piaggio Stella P.IX R.C.40 radial engine. The better reliability of this engine was considered more desirable and so this was the main version produced.

Ro.45
The last of the classic biplanes made by IMAM was an enhanced Ro.37. The sole Ro.45 was first flown on 10 December 1935, but did not enter production.

Operational service
The Ro. 37 served as standard equipment in observation units for many years. However, during WWII, and particularly on the African front, the aeroplane was used in other roles, including tactical support and fighter duty.
103 Squadron was equipped in mid-1935 and swiftly employed in Ethiopia during the Second Italo-Ethiopian War. In December 1935 this unit was sent to Italian Somaliland, and eventually another four squadrons went to this theatre: 105, 108, 109, and 110 Squadrons, for a total of ten Ro.37 and 41 Ro.37Bis. With the end of operations, 110 Squadron remained in the theatre, deployed in counterinsurgency tasks and serving as reinforcement for isolated garrisons.

In the meantime, the Ro.37 also served in the Spanish Civil War, with the first ten arriving in late 1936. Another 26 (possibly 58) went to this theatre and were used for many missions and tasks. They were used as assault aircraft, even though they were unarmoured. The results were satisfactory and some were even converted to a single-seat machine for use as attack fighters. The two-seat versions were used as heavy fighters, providing protection for S.81 bombers from Republican I-15s. It is not known if there were any air-to-air victories.

The Ro.37 was generally liked by pilots, and the only complaint was that aircraft was prone to damage to the undercarriage, and had some engine faults.

The aircraft was produced until 1939 with a total of 569 (237 + 332bis) produced, and as late as 1940 there were provisions to have 17 Squadron equipped with this machine. In fact, the Ro.37 continued to be used as reconnaissance aircraft for years, since its replacement, the Caproni Ca.311, proved unsatisfactory.

Ro.37s were also quite widely exported (ten to Uruguay, 16 to Afghanistan, 14 to Hungary, eight to Austria, and one to Ecuador) and about 280 were in service in 1940, in thirty squadrons consisting of 215 aircraft.

Some were in service up to 1943 and perhaps even later. They were very vulnerable, but in World War II Italy did not have sufficient resources to produce a better observation aircraft, not even the IMAM Ro.63, a superior aircraft, similar to the Fieseler Fi 156 Storch, but with more endurance.

Variants
Ro.37Reconnaissance biplane, powered by a  Fiat A.30 R.A. V-12.
Ro 37bisImproved version, powered by Piaggio P.IX R.C.40 or Piaggio P.X R. radial engines.
IMAM Ro.43  reconnaissance floatplane for the Regia Marina .
Ro.44single-seat fighter floatplane for the Regia Marina .
Ro 45A revised Ro.37, powered by a  Isotta-Fraschini Asso XI R.C.40 engine.

Operators

Afghan Air Force

Austrian Air Force (1927-1938)

Ecuadorian Air Force

Hungarian Air Force

Regia Aeronautica
Aviazione Legionaria 36 aircraft

Spanish Air Force

Uruguayan Air Force

Specifications (Ro.37bis P.IX engine)

See also

Notes

Bibliography
 Angelucci, Enzo and Paolo Matricardi. World Aircraft: World War II, Volume I (Sampson Low Guides). Maidenhead, UK: Sampson Low, 1978. .
  Bignozzi, Giorgio. Aerei d'Italia. Milano, Edizioni E.C.A 2000

 Cull, Brian with Frederick Galea. 249 at Malta: Malta top-scoring Fighter Squadron 1941–1943. Malta, Wise Owl Publications, 2004. 
  De Marchi, Italo – Tonizzo, Pietro. CANT. Z. 506 "airone"- CANT. Z. 1007 "alcione" . Modena, Mucchi Editorr, 1997. NO ISBN.

  Green, William. War Planes of the Second World War: Volume Six – Floatplanes. London:Macdonald, 1962.
  Gunston, Bill. Gli aerei della seconda guerra mondiale. Milano, Alberto Peruzzo Editore, 1984
 Gunston, Bill (2001), The Illustrated Directory of Fighting Aircraft of World War II, Salamander, 
 Marcon, Tullio L'aviazione per il regio esercito Storia Militare magazine July 1995. 
 Mondey, David (1984), The Concise Guide to Axis Aircraft of World War II, Chancellor Press, 
 Mondey, David. The Hamlyn Concise Guide to Axis Aircraft of World War II. London: Bounty Books, 2006. .
The Illustrated Encyclopedia of Aircraft (Part Work 1982–1985), 1985, Orbis Publishing

External links

 
 IMAM Ro.37 and its derivatives
 IMAM Ro.37
 Stormo Magazine (on line), IMAM Ro.37

1930s Italian military reconnaissance aircraft
Ro.37
Biplanes
Single-engined tractor aircraft
Aircraft first flown in 1933